Shotts Bon Accord Football Club are a Scottish football club based in the town of Shotts, North Lanarkshire.

History

In 1995 Shotts were suspended from the Central Region of the SJFA for one season, after launching court action against the organisation. The club were re-admitted to its Second Division (the third tier) in the 1996–97 season. Remarkably they won each of the league's three divisions in consecutive seasons upon their readmission.

Shotts have won the Scottish Junior Cup on two occasions, defeating Pumpherston Juniors 2–0 in 1958, and Auchinleck Talbot 2–1 in 2012.

The team are managed since May 2018 by John McKeown.

Ground

Shotts Bon Accord play at Hannah Park in Shotts. There is a local social club attached.

Also the Motherwell reserve and under-19 teams have played some of their home games at the ground.

The ground was created using local volunteer labour, one of whom - James Hannah - died of thrombosis contracted during the efforts to finish. The park is named in his honour.

As well as being a football stadium, Hannah Park has also been the host venue for the annual Shotts Highland Games.

Current squad

As of February 21, 2020

Coaching staff

Honours

Scottish Junior Cup
 Winners: 1957–58, 2011–12

West of Scotland Cup
Winners: 1963–64

Lanarkshire League
 Champions: 1957–58, 1960–61, 1961–62, 1962–63, 1964–65, 1966–67, 1967–68
 League Cup winners: 1951–52, 1957–58, 1959–60, 1963–64, 1964–65, 1966–67, 1967–68

Central League
 Premier Division champions: 1998–99
 Division One champions: 1987–88, 1997–98
 Division Two champions: 1996–97
 C Division champions: 1976–77
 League Cup winners: 1993–94
 Sectional League Cup winners: 1984–85, 1988–89, 1997–98, 2010–11
 Lanarkshire Junior Cup winners: 1960–61, 1962–63
 Lanarkshire Hozier Cup winners: 1963–64
 Stagecoach Super League Division One: runners up 2004–05

References

External links
 Official website
 Twitter

 
Football clubs in Scotland
Scottish Junior Football Association clubs
Association football clubs established in 1950
Football in North Lanarkshire
1950 establishments in Scotland
Shotts
West of Scotland Football League teams